Fallin' in Love is the third studio album by the band Hamilton, Joe Frank & Reynolds and their first for Playboy Records with whom the band had signed in 1974 about a year after parting ways with their inaugural label Dunhill Records. The band's vocalist and guitarist, Dan Hamilton, wrote the majority of the material for this album (some of which he co-wrote with his wife, Ann). Drummer Alan Dennison also contributed his songwriting abilities for this album with "Barroom Blues" and "Love Is" (the latter of which he co-wrote with the Hamiltons). The only cover on this album is Ellas McDaniel's composition of "Who Do You Love."

Released pursuant to the success of the title track - the sole #1 Pop hit for the band and also the only Playboy Records release to reach the Top 20 of the Billboard Hot 100 - the Fallin' in Love album would yield two further single releases: "Winners and Losers" (#21) and "Everyday Without You" #62.

Both this album and their next Playboy album Love & Conversation were released together in October 2005 as The Playboy Years.

Track listing

Side 1
 "Winners and Losers" - (Dan Hamilton, Ann Hamilton) - 3:11
 "Everyday Without You" - (Dan Hamilton) - 3:05
 "Only Love (Will Break Your Heart)" - (Dan Hamilton) - 3:48
 "What Kind of Love Is This" - (Dan Hamilton) - 3:40
 "Fallin' in Love" - (Dan Hamilton, Ann Hamilton) - 3:03

Side 2
 "Badman" - (Dan Hamilton) - 3:33
 "Who Do You Love" - (Ellas McDaniel) - 2:54
 "Barroom Blues" - (Alan Dennison) - 4:12
 "So Good at Lovin' You" - (Dan Hamilton) - 2:57
 "Love Is" - (Dan Hamilton, Ann Hamilton, Alan Dennison) - 4:37

Charts
Album - Billboard (North America)

Singles - Billboard (North America)

References

1975 albums
Hamilton, Joe Frank & Reynolds albums
Playboy Records albums